The 1996 King Hassan II International Cup Tournament was the first edition of this international football competition. It took place on 11 and 12 December 1996 in Morocco. The host nation Morocco, Croatia, Nigeria and Czech Republic participated in the tournament, and all matches took place at the Stade Mohamed V, home of the Moroccan clubs Raja Casablanca and Wydad Casablanca. The tournament was played in a knock out cup format, with only four games played (two semifinals, a final and a third place match).

The inaugural tournament was won by Croatia after prevailing over the Czech Republic in the penalty shoot-out after a 1-1 draw.

Participating teams 
  (host)

Results

Semifinals

Third place match

Final

Statistics

Goalscorers

References

External links 
 1996 King Hassan II Tournament at rsssf

1996
1996–97 in Moroccan football
1996–97 in Czech football
1996–97 in Croatian football
1996–97 in Nigerian football